The United Nations Assistance Mission for Iraq (UNAMI) was formed on 14 August 2003 by United Nations Security Council (UNSC) Resolution 1500 at the request of the Iraqi government to support national development efforts.

UNAMI's mandate includes advising and assisting the government on political dialogue and national reconciliation; supporting political processes such as elections and the national census; facilitating regional dialogue between Iraq and neighboring countries; coordinating the delivery of humanitarian aid; advancing judicial and legal reforms; and promoting human rights. 

The Mission's achievements include the drafting of Iraq’s 2005 Constitution, assisting in six national elections, coordinating humanitarian and financial assistance from the U.N. and donors, and providing advisory support to the Iraq's parliament, the Council of Representatives. Since 2017, UNAMI has also worked to investigate and bring to justice members of ISIS for their crimes in the country. 

Since its establishment, UNAMI's mandate is subject to annual renewal and review by the UNSC; as of 2019, Resolution 2631 extended its mandate until 31 May 2023.

History
The United Nations has been operating in Iraq since 1955 through a variety of programmes; specialized agencies established their offices in the early 1990s, with UNAMI being established after the 2003 invasion of Iraq. Amid deteriorating conditions in 2007, the UN worked to progressively increase its presence in Iraq and continued to expand its operations throughout the country. The UN maintains its presence in Iraq through the Assistance Mission and the United Nations Country Team (UNCT), which regroups the 20 UN agencies currently operating in Iraq. Former Special Representative of the United Nations Secretary-General Sérgio Vieira de Mello was among 22 killed in a 2003 suicide attack carried out against the United Nations. The death of the envoy who was seen as a likely candidate for Secretary-General left a lasting impact on the United Nations.

Leadership

UNAMI is headed by the Special Representative of the UN Secretary-General (SRSG) for Iraq, who is supported by the Deputy Special Representative for Iraq for Political, Electoral and Constitutional Support, who oversees political and human rights affairs; and the Deputy Special Representative for Iraq, Resident and Humanitarian Coordinator, who oversees UN humanitarian and development efforts. The Mission is administered by the United Nations Department of Political Affairs and supported by the Department of Peacekeeping Operations and the Department of Field Support.

Ashraf Jehangir Qazi (2004–2005): Qazi was appointed SRSG in July 2004 and remained in position until September 2007.  

Staffan de Mistura (2005–2009): De Mistura has a Swedish mother and an Italian father. He was appointed SRSG in September 2007. De Mistura remained in his position until July 2009.  

Ad Melkert (2009–2011): Melkert is from the Netherlands. Melkert studied political science at the University of Amsterdam. Melkert was appointed SRSG in July 2009.  

Martin Kobler (2011–2013): Kobler is from Germany. Kobler was appointed SRSG in August 2011.

Nickolay Mladenov (2013–2015): Mladenov is from Bulgaria. In 1995, he graduated from the University of National and World Economy, majoring in international relations. The following year he obtained an MA in war studies from King's College London. Mladenov was appointed as SRSG in August 2013. Mladenov remained in his post until February 2015, when he was appointed UN Special Coordinator for the Middle East Peace Process. 

Ján Kubiš (2015–2019): Kubiš was appointed SRSG in February 2015. Kubiš is from Slovakia. Kubiš studied international relations at the University of Moscow. Kubiš remained in his post until December 2018. In January 2019, Kubiš was appointed United Nations Special Coordinator for Lebanon.  

Jeanine Hennis-Plasschaert (2019–present): Jeanine Hennis-Plasschaert of the Netherlands is the current SRSG for Iraq, succeeding Ján Kubiš of Slovakia in December 2018. The current Deputy Special Representative for Political, Electoral and Constitutional Affairs is Alice Walpole of the United Kingdom, While Ghulam Isaczai of Afghanistan serves as the Deputy Special Representative responsible for humanitarian and development efforts.

In 2023, there were approximately 648 personnel, 251 international staff and 397 national staff working for UNAMI.

Mandate
The current mandate of UNAMI was extended to 31 May 2023 under UNSC Resolution 2631, adopted on 26 May 2022. One of its tasks is to implement the International Compact with Iraq. The Mission is mandated “as circumstances permit” and “at the request of the Government of Iraq” to:
 Advise support and assist the Government of Iraq in:
 advancing their inclusive, political dialogue and national reconciliation;
 development of processes for holding elections and referenda;
 constitutional review and the implementation of constitutional provisions;
 development of processes acceptable to the Government of Iraq to resolve disputed internal boundaries;
 facilitating regional dialogue, including on issues of border security, energy, and refugees;
 planning, funding and implementing reintegration programmes for former members of illegal armed groups;
 initial planning for the conduct of a comprehensive census;
 Promote, support, and facilitate, in coordination with the Government of Iraq:
 The coordination and delivery of humanitarian assistance and the safe, orderly, and voluntary return, as appropriate;
 The implementation of the International Compact with Iraq, including coordination with donors and international financial institutions;
 The coordination and implementation of programmes to improve Iraq’s capacity to provide essential services for its people and continue active donor coordination of critical reconstruction and assistance programmes through the International Reconstruction Fund Facility for Iraq (IRFFI);
 Economic reform, capacity-building and the conditions for sustainable development, including through coordination with national and regional organizations and, as appropriate, civil society, donors, and international financial institutions;
 The development of effective civil, social and essential services, including through training and conferences in Iraq when possible;
 The contributions of United Nations agencies, funds, and programmes to the objectives outlined in this resolution under a unified leadership of the Secretary-General through his Special Representative for Iraq;
 And also promote the protection of human rights and judicial and legal reform in order to strengthen the rule of law in Iraq

Military representatives and guards
  - 160 troops, who are responsible for protecting UN buildings and staff in the Green Zone. Trained, equipped and transported to Iraq by Australia, the contingent was first deployed to Iraq in December 2004, at which time it consisted of 134 troops.
 -  77 troops and one military observer. After Fiji, Nepal bears the most responsibility for guarding UN assets in Iraq.

Former Participants
  - 100 Romanian soldiers were sent to Iraq in March 2005 for a six-month deployment in support of UNAMI (in addition to Romania's contribution to the US-led Coalition).
  - Around 550 soldiers were deployed in March 2005 to perform UN protection duties (in addition to Georgia's contribution to the US-led Coalition). However, they were placed under U.S. command on a "middle ring security" mission in the Green Zone, and were later redeployed to join the Georgian Multinational Force Iraq contingent.
  - One military observer was deployed from October 2004 to July 2007.
  - One military observer.
  - One military observer.
  - Four military observers.
 - One military observer. Previously, around 35 troops had been deployed as UN guards (in addition to Denmark's contribution to the US-led Coalition).
 - One military observer.
 - Two military observers and one defence civilian.
 - Two military observers.

See also
Multinational Force in Iraq

References

External links
  
Iraq Inter-Agency Information & Analysis Unit Reports, Maps and Assessments of Iraq from the UN Inter-Agency Information & Analysis Unit

Multinational force involved in the Iraq War
United Nations operations in Iraq
1500
2003 establishments in Iraq